Mount Hunter or Begguya is a mountain in Denali National Park in Alaska. "Begguya" means child (of Denali) in the Dena'ina language. Mount Hunter is the third-highest major peak in the Alaska Range.

Mount Hunter has a complex structure: it is topped by a large, low-angled glacier plateau, connecting the North (Main) Summit and the South Summit. Long, corniced ridges extend in various directions; between them are exceptionally steep faces.

Naming of the mountain
The native name for the mountain is Begguya, meaning "Denali's Child". Early prospectors referred to the mountain as Mount Roosevelt. In 1903, Robert Dunn, a reporter for the New York Commercial Advertiser, visited the area as part of Frederick Cook's attempt to climb Mount McKinley. He bestowed the name of his aunt Anna Falconnet Hunter (1885–1941), who financed his trip, on a high nearby mountain, prominent from the northwest. This was, in fact, a different peak, now known as Kahiltna Dome. The name Hunter was mistakenly applied to the present-day Mount Hunter by a government surveyor in 1906.

In October 2010, the South Summit was named Mount Stevens, after Ted Stevens (1923–2010), a former senator of Alaska.

Climbing history
Despite being much lower in elevation than Denali (formerly Mount McKinley), Mount Hunter is a more difficult climb, due to its steep faces and corniced ridges; it also sees far less traffic than its larger neighbor.

Fred Beckey, Heinrich Harrer, and Henry Meybohm completed the first ascent in 1954, via the long West Ridge; this was a great accomplishment for the time and used techniques such as extensive front-pointing which were unusual in the climbing world.

Beginning in 1977, with Michael Kennedy and George Lowe's climb of a route on the northwest face of Mount Hunter, this steep rock and ice face has been the scene of many landmark hard climbs.

Notable ascents
 1954 West Ridge - first ascent of the peak by Fred Beckey, Heinrich Harrer, and Henry Meybohm
 1977 Lowe-Kennedy, on the north face.
 1979 South Spur by John Mallon Waterman (solo, 145 days)
 1981 Moonflower Buttress (Alaska Grade 6: 5.8 A3 AI6 6100') first ascent to last rock band by Mugs Stump and Paul Aubry (NZ).
 1983 Moonflower Buttress to summit, first complete ascent by Todd Bibler and Doug Klewin.
1985 "Diamond Arete" (Alaska Grade 6) first ascent by Jack Tackle and Jim Donini
 1989 Northwest Face first ascent by Conrad Anker and Seth 'S.T.' Shaw, summit attained July 3, 1989.
1994 Deprivation, (Alaska Grade 6, Alpine ED+, 90deg ice)  first ascent by Scott Backes and Mark Francis Twight.
1994 Wall of Shadows, (Alaska Grade 6, AI6+ 5.9 A4)  first ascent by Greg Child and Michael Kennedy.

See also

List of mountain peaks of North America
List of mountain peaks of the United States
List of mountain peaks of Alaska
List of the highest major summits of the United States
List of the most prominent summits of the United States

Notes
  This is excluding the North Peak and other sub-summits of Denali.

References

Sources

External links

 Mount Hunter weather: Mountain Forecast

Alaska Range
Mountains of Matanuska-Susitna Borough, Alaska
Mountains of Alaska
Denali National Park and Preserve
Mount Hunter
Mountains of Denali National Park and Preserve